Sevieri is an Italian surname. Notable people with the surname include:

Alberto Sevieri (born 1945), Italian sport shooter
Federico Sevieri (born 1991), Italian footballer

Italian-language surnames